Fulgoraria (Fulgoraria) rupestris, common name the Asian flame volute, is a species of sea snail, a marine gastropod mollusk in the family Volutidae, the volutes.

Subspecies
 Fulgoraria (Fulgoraria) rupestris politohumerosa Shikama, 1968
 Fulgoraria (Fulgoraria) rupestris rupestris (Gmelin, 1791)
 Fulgoraria (Fulgoraria) rupestris thachi Bail & Chino, 2010
 The forma Fulgoraria (Fulgoraria) rupestris f. aurantia Shikama & Kosuge, 1970 is a synonym of Fulgoraria (Fulgoraria) rupestris rupestris (Gmelin, 1791)

Distribution
This marine species occurs in the demersal zone off Japan, Taiwan, China and Vietnam.

Description

The size of an adult shell varies between 70 mm and 146 mm. The oblong-fusiform shell has a yellowish flesh-color, with zigzagged longitudinal chestnut lines. The spire is moderately elongated, terminating in a papillary summit with the apex lateral, instead of central and vertical as usual in spiral shells. The surface is plicate longitudinally, crossed by engraved revolving lines. There are six or seven columellar plaits. The outer lip is thickened within, its margin slightly crenulate. The interior of the aperture has also a flesh-color.

Lyfe cycle
Embryos develop into free-swimming planktonic marine larvae (trocophore) and later into juvenile veligers.

Bibliography
 Bail, P & Poppe, G. T. 2001. A conchological iconography: a taxonomic introduction of the recent Volutidae. Hackenheim-Conchbook, 30 pp, 5 pl. (updated October 2008 for WoRMS)
 Bail P. & Chino M. (2010) The family Volutidae. The endemic Far East Asian subfamily Fulgorariinae Pilsbry & Olsson, 1954: A revision of the Recent species. A conchological iconography (G.T. Poppe & K. Groh, eds). Hackenheim: Conchbooks.
 Hsi-Jen Tao - Shells of Taiwan Illustrated in Colour
 Harald Douté, M. A. Fontana Angioy - Volutes, The Doute collection
 Ngoc-Thach Nguyên - Shells of Vietnam
 Okutani, T. (ed.), Marine Mollusks in Japan. Tokai University Press, Tokyo, 519-521 (in Japanese)

References

External links
 Gmelin J.F. (1791). Vermes. In: Gmelin J.F. (Ed.) Caroli a Linnaei Systema Naturae per Regna Tria Naturae, Ed. 13. Tome 1(6). G.E. Beer, Lipsiae [Leipzig. pp. 3021-3910.]
 Schumacher C.F. (1817). Essai d'un nouveau système des habitations des vers testacés. Schultz, Copenghagen. iv + 288 pp., 22 pls
 Encyclopedia of life
 Biolib

rupestris
Gastropods described in 1791
Taxa named by Johann Friedrich Gmelin